The 2013 railroad strike in South Korea was a 22 days general strike by members of the Korea Railroad Corporation Union of Korean Railway Workers' Union and Korean Confederation of Trade Unions, Federation of Korean Trade Unions in South Korea between December 9 and December 30, against the establishment of the KTX from Suseo's subsidiary company of Korail.

See also 
Korean Railway Workers' Union
Korail

Reference

2013 labor disputes and strikes
Labour disputes in South Korea
Rail transport strikes
2013 in South Korea